Malham is a village and civil parish in the Craven district of North Yorkshire, England. Before 20th century boundary changes, the village was part of the Settle Rural District, in the historic West Riding of Yorkshire. In the Domesday Book, the name is given as Malgun, meaning "settlement by the gravelly places". In 2001 the parish had a population of approximately 150. Malham parish increased in size geographically (to include Malham Moor) and so at the 2011 Census had a population of 238.

Malham lies at the upper end of the valley of the River Aire, known above Airton as Malhamdale, in the Yorkshire Dales. The surrounding countryside is well known for its limestone pavements and other examples of limestone scenery. Tourist attractions include Malham Tarn, Malham Cove, Gordale Scar, Janet's Foss and the Dry Valley.

In the 1950s the village gave its name to a Ham class minesweeper, HMS Malham.

Governance
Malham has a joint parish council, Kirkby Malhamdale Parish Council, with the parishes of Malham Moor, Kirkby Malham and Hanlith.

Tourism
Malham is a popular walkers' destination. The rise in tourism over Malham's history has led to some deterioration of the area's surrounding paths as tourists wander off the paths and cause pockets of erosion, a process often called "footpath erosion". The footpaths in the area are maintained by the Yorkshire Dales National Park Authority.

In the village there is a National Park Information Centre and a large car park. The Pennine Way long-distance path passes through the village. Nearby natural landmarks include Malham Cove, Malham Tarn, Gordale Scar and Janet's Foss. The Malham Show Fell Race course runs over the nearby  Cawden.

In May 2006, it was reported that a covert listening device was discovered hidden in the local parish hall, leaving the villagers baffled. The electronic transmitter was found in a wall socket during a safety inspection at Malham village hall.

Part of Harry Potter and the Deathly Hallows – Part 1 was filmed around the Malham Cove limestone pavement.

All Creatures Great and Small TV series was largely filmed within the Dales, including some scenes shot in and around Malham Lings and at Janet's Foss waterfall on the Malham Landscape Trail.

Climate
Malham has an Oceanic climate, but is generally colder and wetter than most settlements in Britain. It has a relatively low altitude of around 200 metres, but is partly surrounded by fells. This exposed position means the temperature range is limited, due to little pooling of cold air. Extremes of temperature (since 1960) range from  during August 1990, down to  during March 2001.

Village events
The village hosts an annual agricultural and horticultural show on the Saturday before the August Bank Holiday. Known as the Malham Show, it has competitions for everything from Lego models to fell running. Another major annual event is the Malham Safari, when the villagers and particularly the local school build sculptures around the village. This event attracts many tourists and stalls are put up on the green.

Places of worship
Malham Methodist Church is located in Chapel Gate and is part of the Skipton and Grassington Circuit of the Methodist Church. St Helen's Chapel was an ancient religious foundation mentioned in monastic charters from the twelfth century. It was demolished during the reformation. Archaeological digs at the site have been supported by the Ingleborough Archaeology Group.

Picture gallery

See also
Friar Garth Farmhouse
Malham Tarn Field Studies Centre

References

External links

Village and area web site
Malham and district information/history pages

Villages in North Yorkshire
Civil parishes in North Yorkshire
Craven District